In enzymology, a kynurenine 7,8-hydroxylase is an enzyme that catalyzes the chemical reaction

kynurenate + AH2 + O2  7,8-dihydro-7,8-dihydroxykynurenate + A

The 3 substrates of this enzyme are kynurenate, an electron acceptor AH2, and O2, whereas its two products are 7,8-dihydro-7,8-dihydroxykynurenate and the reduction product A.

This enzyme belongs to the family of oxidoreductases, specifically those acting on paired donors, with O2 as oxidant and incorporation or reduction of oxygen. The oxygen incorporated need not be derive from O miscellaneous.  The systematic name of this enzyme class is  oxidoreductase (hydroxylating). Other names in common use include kynurenic acid hydroxylase, kynurenic hydroxylase, and kynurenate 7,8-hydroxylase.  This enzyme participates in tryptophan metabolism.

References 

 

EC 1.14.99
Enzymes of unknown structure